Crystal Diamond is an American politician serving as a member of the New Mexico Senate from the 35th district. Elected in 2020, she assumed office on January 19, 2021.

Education 
Diamond earned a Bachelor of Science degree in agricultural economics and business from New Mexico State University.

Career 
Prior to entering politics, she served as the director of the Sierra Soil & Water Conservation District and worked as a self-employed agricultural consultant.

In the June 2020 Democratic primary, incumbent Democrat John Arthur Smith was defeated by Neomi Martinez-Parra. Diamond defeated Martinez-Parra in the November general election and assumed office on January 19, 2021. Diamond won 11,256 votes to Martinez-Parra's 8,135, for a margin of 58% to 42%. Prior to Diamond's general election win, the 35th district had not been represented by a Republican in 65 years.

Personal life 
Diamond lives in Elephant Butte, New Mexico.

References 

Living people
Women state legislators in New Mexico
Republican Party New Mexico state senators
New Mexico State University alumni
People from Sierra County, New Mexico
Year of birth missing (living people)
21st-century American women